Félix Lacuesta (born 20 February 1958 in Bayonne) is a French former professional football midfielder.

He was part of SC Bastia team that reached 1978 UEFA Cup Final.

External links
 
 
 Profile at racingstub.com
 Profile at bastia78.forzabastia.com

1958 births
Living people
Sportspeople from Bayonne
French footballers
Association football midfielders
Aviron Bayonnais FC players
AS Saint-Étienne players
SC Bastia players
FC Girondins de Bordeaux players
RC Strasbourg Alsace players
Olympique Lyonnais players
AS Monaco FC players
Lille OSC players
AS Cannes players
Ligue 1 players
French-Basque people
Footballers from Nouvelle-Aquitaine